Year 169 (CLXIX) was a common year starting on Saturday (link will display the full calendar) of the Julian calendar. At the time, it was known as the Year of the Consulship of Senecio and Apollinaris (or, less frequently, year 922 Ab urbe condita). The denomination 169 for this year has been used since the early medieval period, when the Anno Domini calendar era became the prevalent method in Europe for naming years.

Events 
 By place 
 Roman Empire 
 Marcomannic Wars: Germanic tribes invade the frontiers of the Roman Empire, specifically the provinces of Raetia and Moesia.
 Northern African Moors invade what is now Spain.
 Marcus Aurelius becomes sole Roman Emperor upon the death of Lucius Verus.
 Marcus Aurelius forces his daughter Lucilla into marriage with Claudius Pompeianus.  
 Galen moves back to Rome for good.

 China 
 Confucian scholars who had denounced the court eunuchs are arrested, killed or banished from the capital of Luoyang and official life during the second episode of the Disasters of Partisan Prohibitions, which does not formally end until 184 with the onslaught of the Yellow Turban Rebellion.

 By topic 

 Religion 
 Pertinax succeeds Alypius as bishop of Byzantium.
 Theophilus of Antioch becomes patriarch of Antioch.

 Arts and sciences 
 Lucian demonstrates the absurdity of fatalism.

Births 
 Jingū, Japanese empress and regent (d. 269)
 Zhang Liao, Chinese general (d. 222)

Deaths 
 January 23 – Lucius Verus, Roman emperor (b. 130)
 September 10 – Marcus Annius Verus, Roman co-ruler 
 Alypius, bishop of Byzantium (approximate date)
 Li Ying, Chinese scholar and politician

References 

 

als:160er#169